Riddlesburg is a small village in Bedford County, in the U.S. state of Pennsylvania. It is west of Harrisburg, in the central region of the state.

Population
The 2010 census reported a total population of 187 inhabitants, 94 male and 93 female, in the 16672 ZIP code. The ZIP code had a land area of 4.33 square miles.  The median age was 34.5 years. There were 118 housing units, with a median home value of $59,100.  Median income was $33,636.  High school graduates included 69.5% of the population. 29.3% of the population was below the poverty level.

Geography
The main feature of Riddlesburg is the Juniata River that separates the village from Pennsylvania Route 26. The village features a post office, and an auto garage. There was once a grocery store but it went out of business.

References

Unincorporated communities in Bedford County, Pennsylvania
Unincorporated communities in Pennsylvania